The Rennic Road Bridge is a single-span Warren truss bridge in Washington County, Arkansas. It was built c. 1915, probably replacing a bridge built around the time the road was laid out c. 1880. The steel for the trusses came from the Cambria Steel Company of Johnstown, Pennsylvania; the builder is not known.

The bridge was listed on the National Register of Historic Places in 2004 as the County Road 6 Bridge.

See also
National Register of Historic Places listings in Washington County, Arkansas
List of bridges on the National Register of Historic Places in Arkansas

References

Road bridges on the National Register of Historic Places in Arkansas
Transportation in Washington County, Arkansas
National Register of Historic Places in Washington County, Arkansas
Steel bridges in the United States
Warren truss bridges in the United States
1915 establishments in Arkansas
Bridges completed in 1915